J'ai vu le loup ("I saw the wolf") is a French folk song, and also a nursery rhyme or children's song. The song is thought to have medieval origins.

The song exists in many different versions - always with having seen the wolf at the head of a list of other animals, and having seen the wolf do things with human characteristics, such as having seen the wolf, fox, and hare drink, sing and dance.

The composer Maurice Emmanuel included a classical piano setting in his Songs of Burgundy: J'ai vu le loup, however most performances of the song emphasize rougher folk characteristics.

The song Le Loup, le Renard et la Belette, also called La Jument de Michao, is an adaptation of this song.

Some recordings
 "J'ai vu le loup, le renard chanter" (parody of liturgical Dies Irae) Le Poème Harmonique, Vincent Dumestre
 "J'ai vu le loup" (instrumental), Les Musiciens de Saint-Julien 
 "J'ai vu le loup", on Nouveau Monde by Patricia Petibon 
 "J'ai vu le loup", on Ballads by Custer La Rue
 "J'ai vu le loup", BeauSoleil, Michael Doucet 
 "J'ai Vu Le Loup, Le Renard Et La Belette" by Balfa Brothers
 "J'ai vû le loup", on La Roque and Roll: Popular Music of Renaissance France by The Baltimore Consort

References

French songs
French children's songs
Songs about wolves
Early music